Horisme aemulata is a moth belonging to the family Geometridae. The species was first described by Jacob Hübner in 1813.

It is native to Europe.

References

Melanthiini